Oreste Barale (4 October 1904 – 1982) also known as Barale III was an Italian football player from Pezzana Vercellese in the Province of Vercelli. He played club football as a midfielder for Juventus winning two league titles; he also played with Alessandria.

Honours
Juventus
Serie A: 1925–26
Serie A: 1930–31

References

External links
Enciclopedia Del Calcio - Profile

Italian footballers
Serie A players
Juventus F.C. players
U.S. Alessandria Calcio 1912 players
A.C. Monza managers
Calcio Lecco 1912 managers
S.S.D. Pro Sesto managers
Piacenza Calcio 1919 managers
1904 births
1982 deaths
People from Pezzana
Italian football managers
FC Chiasso managers
Italian expatriate football managers
Expatriate football managers in Switzerland
Italian expatriate sportspeople in Switzerland
Association football midfielders
Vigevano Calcio players
Footballers from Piedmont
Sportspeople from the Province of Vercelli